is a Japanese musician and guitarist born on 7 July 1960. He is from Nishinomiya in Hyōgo Prefecture.

Discography

Singles
Funhouse Inc. (BMG Japan)
 (1995)
Happy Xmas (1996, John Lennon) (Duet with Izumiya Shigeru)
Victor Entertainment
 (2005)

Albums
Funhouse Inc. (BMG Japan)

Mercury

Conisis Entertainment (independent)

Victor Entertainment

Because of rights issues with the attached DVD, production was discontinued.

After the album Kōtetsu densatsu ~kin no kan~ was discontinued, the music alone was remastered and sold on this album.

Commercial songs

External links
  

Japanese guitarists
Living people
1960 births